Zenon Przesmycki (pen name Miriam; Radzyń Podlaski, 22 December 1861 – 17 October 1944, Warsaw), was a Polish poet, translator and art critic of the literary period of Młoda Polska, who studied law in Italy, France and England; in 1887–1888 he served as the editor-in-chief of the Warsaw magazine Życie (Life), an influential first-ever publication on modernism in Poland.

Professional career
Zenon Przesmycki was a member of the prestigious Polish Academy of Literature. He first discovered and popularised the work of Polish national poet Cyprian Norwid almost forgotten in exile. Przesmycki published the art magazine Chimera (1901–1908) featuring the works of Norwid. One of his closest friends was Bolesław Leśmian also involved there. Another friend of his, poet Antoni Lange, wrote an ode to him, in a series of Odes to Friends (" Pieśni dla przyjaciół").

Przesmycki published many translations of renowned French poets, including Charles Baudelaire and Paul Verlaine, as well as Edgar Allan Poe and Algernon Charles Swinburne from English. His own 1892 translation of Arthur Rimbaud's The Drunken Boat (Le Bateau ivre) became a literary event in partitioned Poland.

In the interwar period, Przesmycki served as Minister of Culture and Art (1919).

See also

 Polish literature

References

External links
 
 Zenon Przesmycki at poezja.org

1861 births
1944 deaths
Burials at Powązki Cemetery
Polish poets
Polish translators
Members of the Polish Academy of Literature
Culture ministers of Poland
Polish male poets